Włocławek Voivodeship was a unit of administrative division and local government in Poland in the years 1975–1998. It was superseded by Kuyavian-Pomeranian Voivodeship.

Capital city: Włocławek

Population of voivodship: 403,200 (in 1975), 413,400 (in 1980), 425,900 (in 1985), 429,400 (in 1990), 435,000 (in 1995), 434,700 (in 1998).

Car plates: WE, WK, WL.

Major cities and towns: (population in 1998): Włocławek (123,373), Rypin (16,971), Lipno (15,608), Aleksandrów Kujawski (13,031), Ciechocinek (11,312).

See also
 Voivodeships of Poland

Former voivodeships of Poland (1975–1998)

als:Woiwodschaft Włocławek